PikeOS is a commercial, hard real-time operating system (RTOS) that offers a separation kernel based hypervisor with multiple logical partition types for many other operating systems (OS), each called a GuestOS, and applications. It enables users to build certifiable smart devices for the Internet of things (IoT) according to the high quality, safety and security standards of different industries. For safety and security critical real-time applications on controller-based systems without memory management unit (MMU) but with memory protection unit (MPU) PikeOS for MPU is available.

Overview
PikeOS was introduced in 2005 and combines a real-time operating system (RTOS) with a virtualization platform and Eclipse-based integrated development environment (IDE) for embedded systems. It is a commercial clone of L4 microkernel family. PikeOS has been developed for safety and security-critical applications with certification needs in the fields of aerospace, defense, automotive, transport, industrial automation, medical, network infrastructures, and consumer electronics. The PikeOS separation kernel (v5.1.3) is certified against Common Criteria at EAL5+.

A key feature of PikeOS is an ability to safely execute applications with different safety and security levels concurrently on the same computing platform. This is done by strict spatial and temporal segregation of these applications via software partitions. A software partition can be seen as a container with pre-allocated privileges that can have access to memory, central processing unit (CPU) time, input/output (I/O), and a predefined list of OS services. With PikeOS, the term application refers to an executable linked against the PikeOS application programming interface (API) library and running as a process inside a partition. The nature of the PikeOS application programming interface (API) allows applications to range from simple control loops up to full paravirtualized guest operating systems like Linux or hardware virtualized guests.

Software partitions are also called virtual machines (VMs), because it is possible to implement a complete guest operating system inside a partition which executes independently from other partitions and thus can address use cases with mixed criticality. PikeOS can be seen as a Type-1 hypervisor.

Supported toolchain, IDE CODEO
The Eclipse-based IDE CODEO supports system architects with graphical configuration tools, providing all the components that software engineers will need to develop embedded applications, as well as including comprehensive wizards to help embedded project development in a time-saving and cost-efficient way:
 Guided configuration
 Remote debugging (down to the hardware instruction level)
 Target monitoring
 Remote application software deployment
 Timing analysis

Several dedicated graphical editing views are supporting the system integrator to always keep the overview on important aspects of the PikeOS system configuration showing partition types, scheduling, communication channels, shared memory and IO device configuration within partitions.

Projects can be easily defined with the help of reusable templates and distributed to the development groups. Users can configure predefined components for their project and can also define and add other components during the development process.

Key benefits
 Real-time operating system including Type-1 hypervisor defined for highly flexible configuration
 Supports fast or secure booting times
 Supporting mixed criticality via separation kernel in one system
 Configuration of partitions with time and hardware resources
 Kernel driver and user space drivers supported
 Hardware independence between processor types and families
 Easy migration processes and high portability on single- and multi-core
 Developed to support certification according to multiple safety & security standards
 Reduced time to market via standard development and verification tools
 Wide range of supported GuestOS types: APIs
 No export restriction: European solution

Certification standards
Safety certification standards according to:
 Radio Technical Commission for Aeronautics (RTCA) – DO-178B/C
 International Organization for Standardization (ISO) – 26262
 International Electrotechnical Commission (IEC) – 62304, 61508
 EN – 50128, 50657

Security certification standards according to:
 Common Criteria
 SAR (?)

Partner ecosystem
SYSGO is committed to establish the technology and business partnerships that will help software engineers to achieve their goals. , SYSGO is working with about 100 partners globally.

An excerpt of partners per category is mentioned below:
 Board vendors: Curtiss-Wright Controls Embedded Computing, Kontron, MEN or ABACO
 Silicon vendors: NXP, Renesas, Texas Instruments (TI), Xilinx, Infineon, NVidia or Intel
 Software partners: CoreAVI, wolfSSL, Aicas, AdaCore, Esterel, Apex.AI, RTI, PrismTech, Datalight, Systerel, Imagination Technologies or RAPITA
 Tool partners: Lauterbach, Vector Software, Rapita, iSYSTEM
 Supported architectures: ARM, PowerPC, x86, or SPARC (on request)

Supported GuestOS types
 Linux or Android (ideally SYSGO Linux distribution ELinOS)
 POSIX PSE51 with PSE52 extensions
 ARINC 653
 RTEMS
 Java
 AUTOSAR
 Ada, including Ravenscar profile
 and others

End-of-life overview

References

External links
 , SYSGO
 PikeOS Official Product Site
 PikeOS Product Note (PDF)
 PikeOS Flyer (PDF)

Real-time operating systems
Microkernels
Virtualization software
Embedded operating systems
ARM operating systems
Microkernel-based operating systems